John Weaver Jordan (January 4, 1926 – May 18, 2021) was an American and former politician in the state of Florida.

Jordan was born in Danville, Indiana. He is an alumnus of Butler University. He served in the Florida House of Representatives from 1968 to 1970, as a Republican, representing the 80th district.

References

1926 births
2021 deaths
Republican Party members of the Florida House of Representatives
People from Danville, Indiana